The American Opera Project (AOP) is a professional opera company based in Brooklyn, New York City, and is a member of Opera America, the Fort Greene Association, the Downtown Brooklyn Arts Alliance, and the Alliance of Resident Theatres/New York (A.R.T./NY). The company's primary mission is to develop and present new operatic and music theatre works and has gained a reputation for the "rarefied range" of the projects it fosters (Opera News, Dec 2008). AOP was founded in 1988 by Grethe Barrett Holby who served as Artistic Director of AOP from 1988 until 2001, at which point Charles Jarden became the company's Executive Director and Steven Osgood the company's Artistic Director. Steven Osgood left the post of Artistic Director in 2008 to pursue conducting full-time but remains the Artistic Director for AOP's "Composers & the Voice" program. 

AOP's year-long writing fellowship, "Composers & the Voice" was created in 2002 to bring emerging operatic composers and librettists together with singers, directors, and other artists to create a series of pieces exploring the potential of theatre and the voice. Past and present mentors for the program include Mark Adamo, Mark Campbell, John Corigliano, Tan Dun, Daron Hagen, Jake Heggie, Libby Larsen, John Musto, Tobias Picker, Kaija Saariaho, and Stephen Schwartz. Past participants include Clint Borzoni, David Claman, Conrad Cummings, Randall Eng, Renée Favand, Vivian Fung, Kristin Kuster, Hannah Lash, Gilda Lyons, Robert Paterson, Jack Perla, Zach Redler & Sara Cooper, and Daniel Sonenberg.

It has also given many out-of-doors performances sponsored by the City of New York Department of Parks and Recreation. AOP won a 2005 Encore award from the Arts & Business Council of New York for its innovative work.

Operas and other works developed with AOP

World premieres

As One by Laura Kaminsky, Mark Campbell, and Kimberly Reed (BAM Fisher Center, Sept 4, 2014) 
Beauty Intolerable by Sheila Silver with texts by Edna St. Vincent Millay (Symphony Space, June 8, 2013)  
Before Night Falls by Jorge Martin and Dolores M. Koch (Fort Worth Opera, May 29, 1010)   
Brooklyn Bones by Alvin Singleton and Patricia Hampl (Nov 15, 2008)  
Brooklyn Cinderella by Nkeiru Okoye (Dweck Auditorium, June 21, 2011)  
Darkling by Stefan Weisman and Anna Rabinowitz (East 13th Street Theater, Feb 26, 2006) 
Fade by Stefan Weisman and David Cote (NYC PREMIERE at Galapagos Art Space, July 17, 2009)   
Fireworks by Kitty Brazelton and Billy Aronson (July 2, 2002)   
Flurry Tale by Rusty Magee and Billy Aronson, with commissioned orchestrations by John Rinehimer (Clark Studio Theater, Dec 18, 1999)  
Harriet Tubman: When I Crossed that Line to Freedom by Nkeiru Okoye (Irondale Center, Feb 21, 2014) 
Heart of Darkness by Tarik O'Regan and Tom Phillips (Covent Garden, Nov 1, 2011)  
Judgment of Midas by Kamran Ince and Miriam Seidel (Milwaukee Opera Theatre, Feb 12, 2013)  
L'abbe Agathon by Arvo Pärt and Tarik O'Regan (Solomon R. Guggenheim Museum, Jan 11, 2009)  
Love/Hate by Jack Perla and Rob Bailis (San Francisco Opera Center, April 2012)   
Marina: A Captive Spirit by Deborah Drattell and Annie Finch (May 1, 2003)  
Model Love by J. David Jackson based on poems by Henry Normal (Stanley H. Kaplan Penthouse, Oct 2, 2011)  
Nora, in the Great Outdoors by Daniel Felsenfeld and Will Eno (Stanley H. Kaplan Penthouse, Oct 2, 2011)  
Out Cold by Phil Kline (BAM Fisher, Oct 25, 2012)  
Patience and Sarah by Paula M. Kimper and Wende Persons (John Jay College Theater, July 8, 1998)  
Paul's Case by Gregory Spears and Kathryn Walat (Artisphere, Apr 20, 2013)  
Romulus by Louis Karchin (Guggenheim Museum, May 20, 2007)  
Séance on a Wet Afternoon by Stephen Schwartz (NYC PREMIERE at New York City Opera, Apr 19, 2011)   
Sir Gawain and the Green Knight by Richard Peaslee and Kenneth Cavander (Oct 18, 2001)  
The Blind by Lera Auerbach (Lincoln Center. July 9, 2013)  
The Scarlet Ibis by Stefan Weisman and David Cote (HERE Arts Center, Jan 15, 2015) 
This is the Rill Speaking by Lee Hoiby and Lanford Wilson (Purchase College Opera, Apr 26, 2008)   
Tone Test by Nick Brooke (Lincoln Center, July 22, 2004)  
Windows by Zach Redler and Sara Cooper (NYU, March 23, 2013)

Works developed/in development

1000 Splendid Suns by Sheila Silver and Stephen Kitsakas   
African Tales by Nkeiru Okoye and Carman Moore  
Alice in the Time of the Jabberwock by Daniel Felsenfeld and Robert Coover  
Companionship by Rachel Peters  
Decoration by Mikael Karlsson and David Floden  
Eichmann in Jerusalem by Mohammed Fairouz and David Shapiro   
Heinrich Heine: Doppelganger by Jacob Engel, Paula Kimper, and Nino Sandow  
Henry's Wife by Randall Eng and Alexis Bernier  
Independence Eve by Sidney Marquez Boquiren and Daniel Neer  
Lost Childhood by Janice Hamer and Mary Azrael (STAGED WORKSHOP PREMIERE at Tel Aviv-Yafo Music Center, July 29, 2007)  
Marymere by Matt Schickele  
Memoirs of Uliana Rooney by Vivian Fine and Sonya Friedman 
Mila by Andrea Clearfield, Jean Claude Vanitaille, and Lois Walden  
Numinous City by Pete M. Wyer and Melissa Salmons  
Our Basic Nature by John Glover and Kelley Rourke  
Prairie Dogs by Rachel Peters and Royce Vavrek  
Rosencrantz and Guildenstern Are Dead by Herschel Garfein  
Semmelweis by Raymond J. Lustig and Matt Gray  
Sharon's Grave by Richard Wargo, based on the play be John B. Keane  
Tesla in New York by Phil Kline and Jim Jarmusch   
The Bridge of San Luis Rey by Paula M. Kimper  
The Companion by Robert Paterson and David Cote  
The Family Room by Thomas Pasatieri and Daphne Malfitano  
The Golden Gate by Conrad Cummings, based on novel by Vikram Seth  
The Leopard by Michael Dellaira and J.D. McClatchy  
The Summer King by Daniel Sonenberg   
The Walled-Up Wife by Gilda Lyons  
The Wanton Sublime, formerly The Woven Child, by Tarik O'Regan and Anna Rabinowitz (NYC PREMIERE at Roulette, Apr 22, 2014)  
The Weeping Camel by Huang Ruo and Candace Chong  
Three Way by Robert Paterson and David Cote  
Ugetsu by Michael Rose and Emily Howard  
Unruly Horses based on the life and songs of Vladimir Vysotsky, conceived by Mina Yakim and Moni Yakim, with additional book by Peter Kellogg  
Wolf-in-Skins, formerly The Lost Lais of Albion, by Gregory Spears, choreographed by Christopher Williams

References

Sources
Kozinn, Allan (December 9, 1990). "New Work by American Opera Projects". The New York Times 
Kozinn, Allan (May 6, 2003). "An Operatic Treatment Of a Russian Poet's Despair". The New York Times
Ross, Alex (April 24, 1993). "American Operas in Progress". The New York Times 
Singer, Barry (December 2008). "Risky Business ". Opera News, Vol. 73, No. 6

External links

New York City opera companies
Musical groups established in 1988
1988 establishments in New York City